Hechizo de Amor is a Venezuelan telenovela written by Alberto Gómez and produced by Venevisión in 2002. The show lasted 130 episodes and was distributed internationally by Venevisión International.

Emma Rabbe and Guillermo Pérez starred as the main protagonists with Mayra Alejandra as the antagonist.

Synopsis
Ligia Valderrama is a beautiful, self-assured, young woman accustomed to getting everything she wants. Her father, Francisco Valderrama, has spoiled her excessively, perhaps to make up for the harm he did her when she was still a baby. Although Ligia has grown up believing she is the daughter of Raquela, her father’s wife, her real mother is Salome Hernandez, a woman of humble birth who fell in love with Francisco in spite of the fact that he was already married. On a fateful night over 20 years ago, Salome and Francisco were running away with their baby daughter and a briefcase containing a million dollars that he had stolen from his wife’s firm, when they had a serious car accident. Raquela found them unconscious – frustrated because she could never have a child - seized the opportunity to kidnap little Ligia. Threatening Francisco with turning him in for embezzlement, she made him her accomplice in a terrible lie: telling Salome that her daughter was dead. The pain of this news was so unbearable that Salome went insane and was committed in a sanitarium. And so, Ligia grew up in the luxury of the Valderrama’s household, with a slightly cold adoptive mother and a loving, but weak and remorseful, father.

Meanwhile, in a country village a few hours away from the capital, a different story is unfolding. It centers on Mabel Alcantara, another beautiful young woman, whose life is not what it was originally meant to be. Unlike Ligia, Mabel has grown up wild and poor, reared by a kind-hearted couple who took her in when her parents died. She could never imagine that she is actually the owner of the lavish hacienda where she sneaks in to steal mangoes. The current master of the hacienda, Arturo Urbaneja Castro, cheated Mabel’s parents out of the estate, and this circumstance led them to commit suicide. That is why now it is so ironic for Mabel to fall in love with Simón Acariza, son of the scoundrel who deprived her of what was rightfully hers. The passionate love affair that develops between Mabel and Simón will bring them many difficulties…

Almost simultaneously, Ligia finds the man of her dreams: Gabriel Salazar. They fall deeply in love, but this relationship is also bound to fail as Raquela gets in the way, disapproving of the social differences between them. That is when fate confronts Ligia and Mabel. The sweet country girl, pregnant by Simón and shunned by his family, now lives in the city and casually meets Gabriel. She touches him with her gentleness, and now that he is separated from Ligia, he feels the need to care for Mabel, and eventually even asks her to marry him. The marriage does not take place, however, because both Gabriel and Mabel realize they still love Ligia and Simón. After a series of unexpected events, both young couples will finally find happiness together… and at long last, Ligia and Mabel will recover what life had so unfairly taken from them.

Cast

Main 
Emma Rabbe as Ligia Valderrama
Guillermo Pérez as Gabriel Salazar
Caridad Canelón as Salomé Hernández
Wanda D'Isidoro as Mabel Alcántara
Gigi Zancheta as Carolina Sánchez
Aroldo Betancourt as Leonardo Sotomayor
Ana Karina Casanova as Mariana Antúnez
Alberto Alifa as Juan Diego Urbaneja
Julio Alcázar - Arturo Urbaneja Castro. Villain character, who stole the fortune of Mabel's family. Arrested by the police Killed in jail by a prisoner
Mayra Alejandra as Raquela Valderrama. Main Villain character. Goes crazy in the end of the story.

Secondary

References

External links
Hechizo de Amor at the Internet Movie Database

2000 telenovelas
Venevisión telenovelas
Venezuelan telenovelas
2000 Venezuelan television series debuts
2000 Venezuelan television series endings
Spanish-language telenovelas
Television shows set in Caracas